Lin Hu may refer to:

 Lin Hu (warlord) (1887–1960), warlord of the Old Guangxi clique
 Lin Hu (general) (1927–2018), deputy commander of the PLA Air Force

See also
 Linhu (disambiguation)